The beliefs and practices of Jehovah's Witnesses have engendered controversy throughout their history. Consequently, the denomination has been opposed by local governments, communities, and religious groups. Many Christian denominations consider the interpretations and doctrines of Jehovah's Witnesses heretical, and some professors of religion have classified the denomination as a cult.

According to law professor Archibald Cox, Jehovah's Witnesses in the United States were "the principal victims of religious persecution … they began to attract attention and provoke repression in the 1930s, when their proselytizing and numbers rapidly increased." At times, political and religious animosity against Jehovah's Witnesses has led to mob action and governmental repression in various countries including the United States, Canada and Nazi Germany.

During World War II, Jehovah's Witnesses were targeted in the United States, Canada, and many other countries because they refused to serve in the military or contribute to the war effort due to their doctrine of political neutrality. In Canada, Jehovah's Witnesses were interned in camps along with political dissidents and people of Japanese descent.

Jehovah's Witness members have been imprisoned in many countries for their refusal of conscription or compulsory military service. Their religious activities are banned or restricted in some countries, including Singapore, China, Vietnam, Russia and many Muslim-majority countries.

Countries

Benin
During the first presidency of Mathieu Kérékou, activities of Jehovah's Witnesses were banned and members were forced to undergo "demystification training".

Bulgaria
In Bulgaria, Jehovah's Witnesses have been targets of violence by right-wing nationalist groups such as the IMRO – Bulgarian National Movement. On April 17, 2011, a group of about sixty hooded men besieged a Kingdom Hall in Burgas, during the annual memorial of Christ's death. Attackers threw stones, damaged furniture, and injured at least five of the people gathered inside. The incident was recorded by a local television station. Jehovah's Witnesses in Bulgaria have been fined for proselytizing without proper government permits, and some municipalities have legislation prohibiting or restricting their rights to preach.

Canada

In 1984, Canada released a number of previously classified documents which revealed that in the 1940s, "able bodied young Jehovah's Witnesses" were sent to "camps", and "entire families who practiced the religion were imprisoned". The 1984 report stated, "Recently declassified wartime documents suggest [World War II] was also a time of officially sanctioned religious bigotry, political intolerance and the suppression of ideas. The federal government described Jehovah's Witnesses as subversive and offensive 'religious zealots' … in secret reports given to special parliamentarian committees in 1942." It concluded that, "probably no other organization is so offensive in its methods, working as it does under the guise of Christianity. The documents prepared by the justice department were presented to a special House of Commons committee by the government of William Lyon Mackenzie King in an attempt to justify the outlawing of the organizations during the second world war."

China
Jehovah's Witnesses' activities in China are considered illegal. Former Canadian-American Jehovah's Witness missionary Amber Scorah recounted the lengths that she and her husband went through to preach illegally in China in the early 2000s. She describes how local Jehovah's Witnesses were forced to meet secretly in a different location every week, with invites by word-of-mouth only. She also describes how they would vet potential converts to make sure they had no Communist ties or leanings.

Cuba

Under Fidel Castro's communist regime, Jehovah's Witnesses were included among groups considered to be "social deviants" and were sent to forced labor concentration camps to be "reeducated". On July 1, 1974 the group was officially banned and their places of worship closed. Following the ban, members who refused military service were imprisoned for three years; it was reported that members were also imprisoned because of their children's refusal to salute the flag.

Eritrea
In Eritrea, the government stripped Jehovah's Witnesses of their civil and political rights in 1994 after their refusal to engage in voting and military service. Members of all ages have been arrested for participating in religious meetings. On 24 September 1994, three members were arrested and imprisoned without trial. International rights groups are aware of the situation of Jehovah's Witnesses in Eritrea and have repeatedly called for Eritrean authorities to end the persecution.

As of July 2016, 55 members were imprisoned. According to the Watch Tower Society, 28 members were released on December 4, 2020, and another four were released in early 2021.

France

Prior to World War II, the French government banned the Association of Jehovah's Witnesses in France, and ordered that the French offices of the Watch Tower Bible and Tract Society be vacated. After the war, Jehovah's Witnesses in France renewed their operations. In December 1952, France's Minister of the Interior banned The Watchtower magazine, citing its position on military service. The ban was lifted on November 26, 1974.

In the 1990s and 2000s, the French government included Jehovah's Witnesses on its list of "cults", and governmental ministers made derogatory public statements about Jehovah's Witnesses. Despite a century of activity in the country, France's Ministry of Finance opposed official recognition of the denomination; it was not until June 23, 2000 that France's highest administrative court, the Council of State, ruled that Jehovah's Witnesses qualify as a religion under French law. France's Ministry of the Interior sought to collect 60% of donations made to the denomination's entities; Witnesses called the taxation "confiscatory" and appealed to the European Court of Human Rights. On June 30, 2011, the European Court of Human Rights ruled that France's actions violated the religious freedom of Jehovah's Witnesses.

Jehovah's Witnesses in France have reported hundreds of criminal attacks against their adherents and places of worship.

French dependencies
During the ban of The Watchtower in France, publication of the magazine continued in various French territories. In French Polynesia, the magazine was covertly published under the name, La Sentinelle, though it was later learned that The Watchtower had not been banned locally. In Réunion, the magazine was published under the name, Bulletin intérieur.

Georgia
In 1996, a year after Georgia adopted its post-USSR Constitution, the country's Ministry of Internal Affairs began a campaign to confiscate religious literature belonging to Jehovah's Witnesses. Individual Witnesses fled Georgia seeking religious refugee status in other nations. Government officials refused permits for Jehovah's Witnesses to organize assemblies, and law enforcement officials dispersed legal assemblies. In September 2000, "Georgian police and security officials fired blank anti-tank shells and used force to disperse an outdoor gathering of some 700 Jehovah's Witnesses in the town of Natuliki in northwestern Georgia on 8 September, AP and Caucasus Press reported." In 2002, prosecution of a priest who instigated violence against Jehovah's Witness members was impeded by a lack of cooperation by government and law enforcement.

In 2004, Forum 18 referred to the period since 1999 as a "five-year reign of terror" against Jehovah's Witnesses and other religious minorities. Amnesty International noted: "Jehovah's Witnesses have frequently been a target for violence … in Georgia … In many of the incidents police are said to have failed to protect the believers, or even to have participated in physical and verbal abuse."

On May 3, 2007, the European Court of Human Rights ruled against the government of Georgia for its toleration of religious violence toward Jehovah's Witnesses and ordered the victims be compensated for moral damages and legal costs. On October 7, 2014, the European Court of Human Rights, giving its judgement concerning violence against Jehovah's Witnesses in Georgia in the years 2000–2001, unanimously held that Georgia's state officials, in violation of Articles 3, 9 & 14 of the European Convention on Human Rights, had either directly participated in those attacks or had tolerated violence by private individuals against members of the religious group.

South Ossetia
In July 2017, the Supreme Court of South Ossetia ruled that Jehovah's Witnesses were an extreme organization. The court declared a penalty of ten years imprisonment for "any religious activities such as assembly and distributing literature".

Germany

During 1931 and 1932, more than 2000 legal actions were instigated against Jehovah's Witnesses in Germany and members of the group were dismissed from employment. Persecution intensified following Adolf Hitler's appointment as chancellor in 1933 and continued until 1945. A "Declaration of Facts" was issued at a Jehovah's Witness convention in Berlin on June 25, 1933, asserting the group's political neutrality and calling for an end to government opposition. More than 2.1 million copies of the statement were distributed throughout Germany, but its distribution prompted a new wave of persecution against members of the denomination in Germany, whose refusal to give the Nazi salute, join Nazi organizations or perform military service demonstrated their opposition to the totalitarian ideology of National Socialism.

On October 4, 1934, congregations of Jehovah's Witnesses in Germany sent telegrams of protest and warning to Hitler. The Watch Tower Society reported that according to Karl R. A. Wittig, a government officer in Germany at the time, Hitler was shown a number of telegrams protesting the Third Reich's persecution of the Bible Students. Wittig reported: "Hitler jumped to his feet and with clenched fists hysterically screamed: 'This brood will be exterminated in Germany!' Four years after this discussion I was able, by my own observations, to convince myself … that Hitler's outburst of anger was not just an idle threat. No other group of prisoners of the named concentration-camps was exposed to the sadism of the SS-soldiery in such a fashion as the Bible Students were. It was a sadism marked by an unending chain of physical and mental tortures, the likes of which no language in the world can express."

About 10,000 Witnesses were imprisoned, including 2000 sent to concentration camps, where they were identified by purple triangles; as many as 1200 died, including 250 who were executed. From 1935 Gestapo officers offered members a document to sign indicating renouncement of their faith, submission to state authority, and support of the German military. Historian Detlef Garbe says a "relatively high number" of people signed the statement before the war, but "extremely low numbers" of Bible Student prisoners did so in concentration camps in later years.

Despite more than a century of conspicuous activity in the country, Jehovah's Witnesses in Germany were not granted legal recognition until March 25, 2005, in Berlin; in 2006 Germany's Federal Administrative Court in Leipzig extended the local decision to apply nationwide.

India

Jehovah's Witnesses' Office of Public Information has documented a number of mob attacks in India. It states that these instances of violence "reveal the country's hostility toward its own citizens who are Christians." There have been reports that police assist mob attacks on Jehovah's Witnesses or lay charges against the Witnesses while failing to charge other participants involved.

In Davangere on December 20, 2010 a mob confronted two female Witnesses. The mob broke into the home of one of the Witnesses where they had taken refuge. Property was damaged and one of the Witnesses was assaulted. When the police arrived, the Witnesses were arrested and charged with blasphemy. In another incident on December 6, 2011, three Witnesses were attacked by a mob in Madikeri. The male Witness "was kicked and pummeled by the mob" and then dragged towards a nearby temple; while making lewd remarks, the mob "tried to tear the clothes off of the female Witnesses". According to the Watch Tower Society, the police "took the three Witnesses to the police station and filed charges against them rather than the mob". During a July 2012 incident, a group of fifteen men assaulted four Witnesses in Madikeri. The group was taken to a police station and charged with "insulting the religion or religious beliefs of another class" before being released on bail.

Malawi

In 1967, thousands of Jehovah's Witnesses in Malawi were beaten and killed by police and citizens for refusing to purchase a card indicating endorsement of the Malawi Congress Party. While their political neutrality during the time of the old Colonial government was seen as an act of resistance, their continued non-involvement with the new independent government was viewed as treasonous. The organization was declared illegal and foreign members in the country were expelled. Persecution, both economic and physical, intensified after a September 1972 Malawi Congress Party meeting which stated that "all Witnesses should be dismissed from their employment; any firm that failed to comply would have its license cancelled". By November 1973, 21,000 Jehovah's Witnesses had fled to neighboring Zambia. In 1993, during the transition to a multiparty system and a change in leadership, the government's ban on the organization was lifted.

Russia

Russian anti-extremism laws were extended to non-violent groups in 2007 and Jehovah's Witnesses were banned in the port city of Taganrog in 2009 after a local court ruled that the organization was guilty of inciting religious hatred by "propagating the exclusivity and supremacy" of their religious beliefs.

On December 8, 2009, the Supreme Court of Russia upheld the ruling of the lower courts which pronounced 34 pieces of Jehovah's Witness literature extremist, including their magazine The Watchtower. Jehovah's Witnesses claim this ruling affirms a misapplication of a federal law on anti-extremism. The ruling upheld the confiscation of property of Jehovah's Witnesses in Taganrog. The chairman of the presiding committee of the Administrative Center of Jehovah's Witnesses in Russia, Vasily Kalin, said, "I am very concerned that this decision will open a new era of opposition against Jehovah's Witnesses, whose right to meet in peace, to access religious literature and to share the Christian hope contained in the Gospels, is more and more limited." On December 1, 2015, a Rostov Regional Court convicted 16 Jehovah's Witnesses of practicing extremism in Taganrog, with five given -year suspended sentences and the remainder were issued fines they were not required to pay.

On May 5, 2015, customs authorities in Russia seized a shipment containing Bibles published by Jehovah's Witnesses. Russian customs officials in Vyborg held up a shipment of 2,013 Bibles on July 13, 2015. Customs authorities confiscated three of the Bibles, sent them to an expert to study the Bibles to determine whether they contained extremist language, and impounded the rest of the shipment.

On July 21, 2015, the Russian Federation Ministry of Justice added Jehovah's Witnesses' official website to the Federal List of Extremist Materials, making it a criminal offense to promote the website from within the country and requiring internet providers throughout Russia to block access to the site.

On March 23, 2017, the Russian News Agency TASS reported that Russia's Justice Ministry had suspended the activities of the Administrative Center of Jehovah's Witnesses in Russia due to extremist activities. On April 4, 2017, UN Special Rapporteur on Freedom of Opinion and Expression David Kaye, UN Special Rapporteur on Freedoms of Peaceful Assembly and Association Maina Kiai, and UN Special Rapporteur on Freedom of Religion and Belief Ahmed Shaheed condemned Russia's desire to ban Jehovah's Witnesses.

On April 20, 2017, The Supreme Court of Russia issued a verdict upholding the claim from the country's Justice Ministry that Jehovah's Witnesses' activity violated laws on "extremism". The ruling liquidated the group's Russian headquarters in Saint Petersburg and all of its 395 local religious organizations, banning their activity and ordering their property to be seized by the state. According to the human rights organization Forum 18, this is the first time a court has ruled a registered national centralized religious organization as "extremist". Many countries and international organizations have spoken out against Russia's religious abuses of Jehovah's Witnesses. Leaders of various denominations have also spoken out against Russia's decision to ban the denomination. An article in Newsweek stated, "Russia's decision to ban Jehovah's Witnesses in the country shows the 'paranoia' of Vladimir Putin's government, according to the chair of the United States Commission on International Religious Freedom (USCIRF)." The United States Holocaust Memorial Museum also expressed deep concern over Russia's treatment of Jehovah's Witnesses.

In May 2017, armed Federal Security Services (FSB) officers arrested Dennis Christensen, a 46-year-old Danish citizen, at a hall in Oryol on charges related to extremism. On February 6, 2019, he was found guilty and sentenced to six years in prison.

On February 24, 2021, a Russian court in the Republic of Khakassia sentenced 69-year-old Valentina Baranovskaya to two years in prison for taking part in religious activities that have been banned in Russia. She is the first female member of the denomination to be imprisoned in Russia since their activities were banned in 2017. Her 46-year-old son Roman Baranovsky was also sentenced to six years in prison. According to the Watch Tower Society, the Supreme Court denied their appeal on May 24, 2021, and added restrictions to be imposed on them after their release. Commenting on the sentence, the USCIRF tweeted that the sentencing of an elderly woman in poor health marks a "new low in Russia's brutal campaign against religious freedom."

In at least two instances, arrests have involved torture: in Surgut in 2019, and in Irkutsk (by OMON officers) in 2021.

On October 6, 2022, three Jehovah's Witnesses were sentenced to six years in prison in Sevastopol, a city that belongs to a part of Ukraine annexed by Russia. Although the denomination's activities are legal in Ukraine, the decision was made by "a Moscow-imposed court" that found them guilty of organizing activities for Jehovah's Witnesses.

Singapore
In 1972, the Singapore government de-registered and banned the activities of Jehovah's Witnesses on the grounds that its members refuse to perform military service (which is obligatory for all male citizens), salute the flag, or swear oaths of allegiance to the state. Literature published by the denomination was also banned, and a person in possession of the banned literature may be fined up to S$2,000 (US$1,333) and jailed up to 12 months for a first conviction.

In 1994, the High Court of Singapore ruled on the case of Chan Hiang Leng Colin v Public Prosecutor, finding that banning the Jehovah's Witnesses did not violate the right to freedom of religion guaranteed by Article 15(1) of the Constitution of Singapore. According to the ruling by Chief Justice Yong Pung How, their refusal to perform military service was contrary to public peace, welfare and good order, and laws relating to public order are exceptions to freedom of religion set out in Article 15(4).

In February 1995, Singapore police raided private homes where group members were holding religious meetings, in an operation codenamed "Operation Hope". Officers seized Bibles, religious literature, documents and computers, and eventually brought charges against 69 Jehovah's Witnesses, many of whom went to jail. In March 1995, 74-year-old Yu Nguk Ding was arrested for carrying two "undesirable publications"—one of them a Bible printed by the Watch Tower Society.

In 1996, eighteen Jehovah's Witnesses were convicted for unlawfully meeting in a Singapore apartment and were given sentences from one to four weeks in jail. Canadian Queen's Counsel Glen How argued that the restrictions against the Jehovah's Witnesses violated their constitutional rights. Then-Chief Justice Yong Pung How questioned How's sanity, accused him of "living in a cartoon world" and referred to "funny, cranky religious groups" before denying the appeal. In 1998, two Jehovah's Witnesses were charged in a Singapore court for possessing and distributing banned religious publications.

In 1998, a Jehovah's Witness lost a lawsuit against a government school for wrongful dismissal for refusing to sing the national anthem or salute the flag. In March 1999, the Court of Appeals denied his appeal. In 2000, public secondary schools indefinitely suspended at least fifteen Jehovah's Witness students for refusing to sing the national anthem or participate in the flag ceremony. In April 2001, one public school teacher, also a member of Jehovah's Witnesses, resigned after being threatened with dismissal for refusing to participate in singing the national anthem.

Singapore authorities have seized Jehovah's Witnesses' literature on various occasions from individuals attempting to cross the Malaysia–Singapore border. In thirteen cases, authorities warned the Jehovah's Witnesses but did not press charges.

The initial sentence for failure to comply is 15 months' imprisonment, with an additional 24 months for a second refusal. Failure to perform annual military reserve duty, which is required of all those who have completed their initial two-year obligation, results in a 40-day sentence, with a 12-month sentence after four refusals.

South Africa
Beginning on June 7, 1967, the apartheid South African government passed the Defense Amendment Bill, making it compulsory for all white males of eligible age to participate in the armed forces. Conscription brought Jehovah's Witnesses into conflict with the government, and young men who refused military service were sentenced to no less than 12 months at a military detention barracks, with repeat convictions in some cases. According to the Survey of Race Relations in South Africa of 1974, during 1973, 158 Jehovah's Witnesses were sentenced "for refusing on religious grounds to render service or undergo training." In the first half of 1974, 120 Jehovah's Witnesses were sentenced. Conscription was officially ended in late August 1993. By this time, the Constitution of South Africa had been adjusted to allow for alternative civilian service instead of military service.

Soviet Union
Jehovah's Witnesses did not have a significant presence in the Soviet Union prior to 1939 when the Soviet Union forcibly incorporated eastern Romania, Moldavia, and Lithuania, each of which had a Jehovah's Witness movement. Although never large in number (estimated by the KGB to be 20,000 in 1968), the Jehovah's Witnesses became one of the most persecuted religious groups in the Soviet Union during the post-World War II era. Members were arrested or deported, and some were put in Soviet concentration camps. Witnesses in Moldavian SSR were deported to Tomsk Oblast; members from other regions of the Soviet Union were deported to Irkutsk Oblast. KGB officials, who were tasked with dissolving the Jehovah's Witness movement, were disturbed to discover that the Witnesses continued to practice their faith even within the labor camps.

The Minister of Internal Affairs, Viktor Semyonovich Abakumov proposed the deportation of the Jehovah's Witnesses to Stalin in October 1950. A resolution was voted by the Council of Minister and an order was issued by the Ministry for State Security in March 1951. The Moldavian SSR passed a decree "on the confiscation and selling of the property of individuals banished from the territory of the Moldavian SSR", which included the Jehovah's Witnesses.

In April 1951, over 9,000 Jehovah's Witnesses were deported to Siberia under a plan called "Operation North". The Soviet government was so disturbed by the Jehovah's Witnesses who continued to receive religious literature smuggled from Brooklyn that the KGB was authorized to send agents to infiltrate the Brooklyn headquarters.

In September 1965, a decree of the Presidium of the USSR Council of Ministers canceled the "special settlement" restriction of Jehovah's Witnesses, though the decree, signed by Anastas Mikoyan, stated that there would be no compensation for confiscated property. However, Jehovah's Witnesses remained the subject of state persecution due to their ideology being classified as anti-Soviet.

Turkmenistan
The United Nations Human Rights Committee has indicated that Jehovah's Witnesses in Turkmenistan have been prosecuted and imprisoned for refusing to perform compulsory military service, despite Turkmenistan's constitution guaranteeing the right to "practice any religion alone or in association with others" and the right to "freedom of conviction and the free expression of those convictions". The UN committee noted, "The State party should take all necessary measures to review its legislation with a view to providing for alternative military service. The State party should also ensure that the law clearly stipulates that individuals have the right to conscientious objection to military service. Furthermore, the State party should halt all prosecutions of individuals who refuse to perform military service on grounds of conscience and release those individuals who are currently serving prison sentences." In May 2021, the Watch Tower Society reported that Turkmenistan has released all Jehovah's Witnesses who had been imprisoned for conscientious objection to military service.

According to the US Department of State, Turkmenistan's Ministry of Justice described Jehovah's Witnesses as foreign and dangerous. The US State Department also stated that the Turkmenistan government imposes restrictions on the freedom of Jehovah's Witness parents (and members of various other religious groups) to raise their children in accordance with their religious beliefs. In 2003, Jehovah's Witnesses' religious literature was confiscated, members of the denomination were denied exit visas, and others were stopped after crossing a border and forced to return. In 2004, five Jehovah's Witnesses were stopped and prevented from boarding a flight to another country because their names were included on a "black list" of citizens prohibited from leaving the country. In 2015, a Jehovah's Witness in Turkmenistan was sentenced to four years in prison for allegedly inciting hatred at a religious meeting held in a private home, and other attendees were fined.

United States

During the 1930s and 1940s, some US states passed laws that made it illegal for Jehovah's Witnesses to distribute their literature, and children of Jehovah's Witnesses in some states were banned from attending state schools.

The persecution of Jehovah's Witnesses for their refusal to salute the flag became known as the "Flag-Salute Cases". Their refusal to salute the flag became considered as a test of the liberties for which the flag stands, namely the freedom to worship according to the dictates of one's own conscience. The Supreme Court found that the United States, by making the flag salute compulsory in Minersville School District v. Gobitis (1940), was impinging upon the individual's right to worship as one chooses—a violation of the First Amendment Free Exercise Clause in the constitution. However, Justice Frankfurter, speaking on behalf of the 8-to-1 majority view against the Witnesses, stated that the interests of "inculcating patriotism was of sufficient importance to justify a relatively minor infringement on religious belief". The ruling resulted in a wave of persecution. Lillian Gobitas, one of the schoolchildren involved in the decision, said, "It was like open season on Jehovah's Witnesses."

The American Civil Liberties Union reported that by the end of 1940, "more than 1,500 Witnesses in the United States had been victimized in 335 separate attacks". Such attacks included beatings, being tarred and feathered, hanged, shot, maimed, and even castrated. As reports of attacks against Jehovah's Witnesses continued, "several justices changed their minds, and in West Virginia State Board of Education v. Barnette (1943), the Court declared that the state could not impinge on the First Amendment by compelling the observance of rituals."

In 1943, after a drawn-out litigation process by Watch Tower Society lawyers in state courts and lower federal courts, the Supreme Court ruled that public school officials could not force Jehovah's Witnesses and other students to salute the flag and recite the Pledge of Allegiance. In 1946 and 1953 Supreme Court decisions were handed down establishing their right to be exempted from military service.

Notes

References

Bibliography

Further reading
Persecution and Resistance of Jehovah's Witnesses During the Nazi Regime, edited by Hans Hesse, 
 Paul Johnson, A History of Christianity, 
 M. James Penton, Apocalypse Delayed: The Story of Jehovah's Witnesses (University of Toronto Press, 1985).
 

Persecution of Jehovah's Witnesses